Gwandong (관동) is a region coinciding with the former Gangwon Province in Korea. Today, the term refers to South Korea's Gangwon Province and North Korea's Kangwon Province. The name is often used to refer to people residing in the region.

The term literally means "east of Daegwallyeong", a mountain pass in the Taebaek Mountains of the eastern Korean peninsula.

References
 
 
 

Regions of Korea